The cinderella shrew (Crocidura cinderella) is a species of mammal in the family Soricidae. It is found in Burkina Faso, Gambia, Guinea-Bissau, Mali, Mauritania, Niger, and Senegal. Its natural habitat is dry savanna.

References
 Hutterer, R. & Granjon, L. 2004.  Crocidura cinderella.   2006 IUCN Red List of Threatened Species.   Downloaded on 30 July 2007.

Crocidura
Mammals described in 1911
Taxa named by Oldfield Thomas
Taxonomy articles created by Polbot